Toko'yoto or "Crab" was the Chukchi god of the sea. Specifically, he was the creator and ruler of the Pacific Ocean . Some tribes refer to him as Anky-Kele and attribute to him the power over life and death.

References

Siberian deities